Pierre Brejoux was Inspector General of the Appellation d'Origine Controlee Board, which controls the production of top French wines. he served as an expert wine taster in the Paris Wine Tasting of 1976. In the blind tasting, California wines won both the red and white wine categories. After the tasting, there were many calls for him to resign his position as Inspector General because so many people and groups were highly displeased with the results.  He later revealed to George Taber that he traveled to California in 1974 and 'learned a lot - to my surprise...'.  Brejoux also authored several books on French wine.

Published works

See also 
List of wine personalities

References

Further reading
 

Wine critics
Living people
Year of birth missing (living people)